The University of Santo Tomas Museum of Arts and Sciences is the oldest existing museum in the Philippines. It started as a Gabinete de Fisica, or observation room, of mineral, botanical and biological collections in the 17th century. Under the old Spanish educational law the collections were used as classroom materials, especially in Medicine and Pharmacy.

History
Ramon Martinez, O.P., a professor of natural history, founded the UST Museum of Arts and Sciences in 1871. However, it was Casto de Elera, O.P., who started to systematically gather and catalogue all the collections, some of which date back to 1682.

Considered the oldest school-based museum in the Philippines, the UST Museum became a repository of scientific and artistic articles, and objets d’art. Starting in 1941, the museum acquired the works of Filipino masters such as Fernando and Pablo Amorsolo, Carlos Francisco, Vicente Manansala, and Galo Ocampo. The museum has permanent displays for specimens of natural history, ethnographic materials, Oriental art objects, Philippine religious images, paintings, and Coins, Medals, and Memorabilia. The painting collection includes works from the 17th to the 20th century.

The museum also houses the museum gallery, a souvenir shop, and a mini-library. The museum gallery has served as the venue for art exhibitions.

Collections

 Natural history
 Visual arts
 Philippine religious images
 Coins, medals and memorabilia
 Non-Philippine Oriental arts
 Ethnography

Facilities
 Library
 Museum gallery
 Curio shop
 Conservation laboratory

References

Literature 

Museum of Arts and Sciences
Museums in Manila
Art museums and galleries in the Philippines
Museums established in 1871
1871 establishments in the Philippines
University museums in the Philippines
Natural history museums in the Philippines
Buildings and structures in Sampaloc, Manila
19th-century religious buildings and structures in the Philippines